Hope Nature Forgives is the fifth album released by New Zealand rock band The Feelers. It was released on 1 August 2011. Hope Nature Forgives debuted in the Official New Zealand Top 40 Albums on 8 August 2011. It has been in the Top 40 Albums for nine weeks with a highest position of #4.

Track listing

References

External links
The Official Feelers Website

2011 albums
The Feelers albums